Sasural is a Bollywood film. It was released in 1941. The film was directed by Chaturbhuj Doshi for Ranjit Movietone. The story was by Gunvantrai Acharya with dialogues by R. S. Rammyae. Cinematographer was G. G. Gogate with audiography by C. K. Trivedi. Gyan Dutt was the music director, with lyrics by D. N. Madhok. The cast included Motilal, Madhuri, Nurjehan, Miss Iqbal, Kantilal, Tarabai, Bhagwandas, and Urmila.

The film was a romantic comedy about wrongful identification of a groom by his wife-to-be in a household consisting of a father, step-mother step-son some friends and several servants.

Cast
 Motilal
 Madhuri
 Nurjehan
 Kantilal
 Miss Iqbal
 Tarabai
 Bhagwandas
 Urmila
 Popatlal
Bhim
Brujmala

Review

The comedy came from gags which according to the review, "intellectuals would like to forget as stupid", turned out to be the major source of entertainment in the film. Motilal was cited to be good "Motilal scores with ease", and "is the main item of acting in the whole picture". The actress Nur Jehan (not to be confused with singer-actress Noor Jehan) was praised for her singing and acting abilities as the maid "gives quite a thrilling bit of work as the maid".

Soundtrack
The music was composed by Gyan Dutt and notable songs sung by Rajkumari were, "Ik Meethi Nazar Banke" and "Woh Apna Jadu Nigahon Se Azma Rahe Hai".  The lyricist was D. N. Madhok and the singers were Motilal, Kantilal, Rajkumari, Nur Jehan, Brijmala, Miss Iqbal.

Songlist

References

External links
 

1941 films
1940s Hindi-language films
Films scored by Gyan Dutt
Indian black-and-white films
Films directed by Chaturbhuj Doshi